Nigel William Morris (born June 1958) is a British businessman. He is the managing partner of QED Investors and co-founded Capital One Financial Services with Richard Fairbank.

Early life
Nigel William Morris was born in Billericay, Essex, the son of an army sergeant, in June 1958. He grew up in London.

With an army father, and moving around the country, Morris went to 11 different schools, ending up at Lancaster Royal Grammar School. Morris earned a bachelor's degree in psychology from North East London Polytechnic, followed by an MBA from London Business School, where he is also a Fellow.

Career
Morris is the director of QED Investors, a venture capital firm focused on high-growth companies that leverage the power of data strategies. In addition, he works in an advisory capacity with personalized prepaid debit card provider CARD.com, General Atlantic Partners and Oliver Wyman Consulting. He serves on the board of for-profit companies, including Remitly, Red Ventures, CAN Capital, Media Math, borro, and Prosper. He is also on the boards of National Geographic, ideas42, and the London Business School.

Previously, Morris co-founded Capital One Financial Services in 1994.  During Morris's ten-year tenure, Capital One's net income after taxes (NIAT) grew at a compound annual rate of more than 32%.

Personal life
Morris lives with his wife and four children in Virginia, US.

References

Alumni of London Business School
English businesspeople
British corporate directors
People educated at Lancaster Royal Grammar School
English bankers
Living people
1958 births
Alumni of the University of East London
People from Billericay